In Italian cuisine, ragù is a meat-based sauce that is commonly served with pasta. An Italian gastronomic society, Accademia Italiana della Cucina, documented several ragù recipes. The recipes' common characteristics are the presence of meat and the fact that all are sauces for pasta. The most typical is ragù alla bolognese (Bolognese sauce, made with minced beef). Other types are ragù alla napoletana (Neapolitan ragù, made with a variety of pork and beef meats which may include sausages), ragù alla barese (Bari ragù, sometimes made with horse meat), ragù alla veneta (ragu from Veneto, a traditionally tomatoless duck ragù).

Varieties
In northern Italian regions, ragù typically uses minced, chopped or ground meat, cooked with sauteed vegetables in a liquid, which traditionally include liquidized tomatoes, but also exist in tomatoless versions referred to as ragù in bianco (white ragu). The meats may include one or more of beef, chicken, pork, duck, goose, lamb, mutton, veal, or game, including their offal. The liquids can be broth, stock, water, wine, milk, cream or tomato, often in combination. If tomatoes are included, they are typically limited relative to the meat, making it a meat stew rather than a tomato sauce with added meat.

In southern Italian regions, ragù is often prepared from substantial quantities of large, whole cuts of beef and pork, and sometimes regional sausages, cooked with vegetables and tomatoes. After a long braise (or simmer), the meats are removed and may be served as a separate course without pasta. Examples of these dishes are ragù alla Napoletana (Neapolitan ragù) and carne al ragù.

History
Etymologically speaking, the term comes from the French ragoût and reached the region of Emilia-Romagna in the late 18th century, perhaps following Napoleon's 1796 invasion and occupation of those northern regions. Prior to that time, peninsula cuisine  had a long history of meat stews going back to the Renaissance period. However, they were neither known as ragù nor is there any record of pairing them with pasta. Starting in the 16th century, it was not uncommon for pasta to be cooked in and served with a meat broth, often like a simple soup, from which the meat was removed and served separately, if eaten at that time.

The first documented recipe for a meat sauce, in which the cooked meat was an integral part of the sauce served with pasta, dates from the end of the 18th century. The first ragù as a sauce, ragù per i maccheroni, was recorded by Alberto Alvisi, the cook to the Cardinal of Imola (at the time maccheroni was a general term for pasta, both dried and fresh). The recipe was replicated and published as Il Ragù del Cardinale (The Cardinal's Ragù).

After the early 1830s, recipes for ragù appear frequently in cookbooks from the Emilia-Romagna region. By the late 19th century the cost of meat saw the use of heavy meat sauces on pasta reserved to feast days and Sundays, and only among the wealthier classes of the newly unified Italy.

Independent research by Kasper and De Vita indicates that, while ragù with pasta gained popularity through the 19th century, it was largely eaten by the wealthy. However, technological advances that came with the industrial revolution at the end of the 19th century made pasta flour more affordable for the less affluent. The adoption of pasta by the common classes further expanded in the period of economic prosperity that followed World War II. According to De Vita, before World War II, 80% of the Italian rural population ate a diet based on plants; pasta was reserved for special feast days and was then often served in a legume soup.

See also

 Ragout

References

External links

 CIBO-Culinary Institute of Bologna original Ragu Bolognese sauce recipe

Italian sauces
Tomato sauces
Meat-based sauces